The 2013 NWT/Yukon Scotties Tournament of Hearts, the women's provincial curling championship for the Northwest Territories and Yukon, was held from January 11 to 13 at the Fort Smith Curling Club in Fort Smith, Northwest Territories. The winning team of Kerry Galusha will represent NWT/Yukon at the 2013 Scotties Tournament of Hearts in Kingston, Ontario.

The championship was originally scheduled to be held from January 24 to 27 at the Whitehorse Curling Club in Whitehorse, Yukon, but the Yukon Curling Association announced it would not be sending teams to the event. Therefore, the Northwest Territories Scotties Tournament of Hearts alone will constitute the NWT/Yukon Scotties Tournament of Hearts, and the winner of the Northwest Territories Scotties Tournament of Hearts will determine the region's representative at the 2013 Scotties Tournament of Hearts.

Teams

Round-robin standings

Round-robin results
All draw times are listed in Mountain Standard Time (UTC-7).

Draw 1
Friday, January 11, 1:30 pm

Draw 2
Friday, January 11, 6:00 pm

Draw 3
Saturday, January 12, 8:30 am

Draw 4
Saturday, January 12, 12:30 pm

Draw 5
Saturday, January 12, 12:30 pm

Draw 6
Sunday, January 13, 8:30 am

Tie breaker
Sunday, January 13, 12:30 pm

References

NWT Yukon
Curling in the Northwest Territories
Curling in Yukon
2013 in Yukon
2013 in the Northwest Territories